Canoas de Punta Sal District is one of the three districts of the province Contralmirante Villar in Peru.

References